{{DISPLAYTITLE:C2HCl3O}}
The molecular formula C2HCl3O (molar mass: 147.39 g/mol, exact mass: 145.9093 u) may refer to:

 Chloral, also known as trichloroacetaldehyde or trichloroethanal
 Dichloroacetyl chloride